Paint Creek is a stream in Preble County, Ohio, in the United States. It is a tributary of Sevenmile Creek.

Paint Creek was named from deposits of ochre found there which Native Americans used for body painting.

Paint Creek is dammed to form a reservoir, Lake Lakengren.

Location
Mouth: Confluence with Sevenmile Creek south of Camden at 
Source: Preble County west of Eaton at 
Lake Lakengren Dam:

See also
List of rivers of Ohio

References

Rivers of Preble County, Ohio
Rivers of Ohio